The 2016–17 Charleston Southern Buccaneers men's basketball team represented Charleston Southern University during the 2016–17 NCAA Division I men's basketball season. The Buccaneers, led by 12th-year head coach Barclay Radebaugh, played their home games at the CSU Field House in North Charleston, South Carolina as members of the Big South Conference. They finished the season 12–19, 7–11 in Big South play to finish in a tie for seventh place. They defeated Presbyterian in the first round of the Big South tournament before losing to Winthrop in the quarterfinals.

Previous season
The Buccaneers finished the 2015–16 season 9–21, 5–13 in Big South play to finish in a four-way tie for eighth place. They lost in the first round of the Big South tournament to Longwood.

Roster

Schedule and results

|-
!colspan=9 style=| Non-conference regular season

|-
!colspan=9 style=| Big South regular season

|-
!colspan=9 style=| Big South tournament

References

Charleston Southern Buccaneers men's basketball seasons
Charleston Southern
2016 in sports in South Carolina
2017 in sports in South Carolina